Furby (from  'pine' +  'village') is a locality in Badelunda parish, Västerås Municipality, Sweden. It was previously a parish of its own, but now only a church ruin remains. Furby is a few kilometers north of Lake Mälaren and near Anundshögen, the ship burial mound of legendary Swedish king Anund.

Legal issues 
Furby was forced to change their name in Sweden to "Furbee" as it could get mixed up with the town.

External links 
About the church ruin in Furby 
A map of Badelunda parish 

Populated places in Västmanland County
Tumuli in Sweden